Snowshoe Lake is a lake in the Lake Huron drainage basin in Whitestone, Parry Sound District, Ontario, Canada, about  north of the community of Maple Island, and  southeast of the community of Arnstein. The lake drains via unnamed creek to the Kimikong River, and then via the Pickerel and French rivers into Lake Huron.

See also
List of lakes in Ontario

References

Lakes of Parry Sound District